The UK Singles Chart is one of many music charts compiled by the Official Charts Company that calculates the best-selling singles of the week in the United Kingdom. Before 2004, the chart was only based on the sales of physical singles. This list shows singles that peaked in the Top 10 of the UK Singles Chart during 1984, as well as singles which peaked in 1983 and 1985 but were in the top 10 in 1984. The entry date is when the single appeared in the top 10 for the first time (week ending, as published by the Official Charts Company, which is six days after the chart is announced).

One-hundred and forty-two singles were in the top ten in 1984. Eight singles from 1983 remained in the top 10 for several weeks at the beginning of the year, while "Like a Virgin" by Madonna and "Shout" by Tears for Fears were both released in 1984 but did not reach their peak until 1985. "Islands in the Stream" by Kenny Rogers & Dolly Parton, "Marguerita Time" by Status Quo and "Tell Her About It" by Billy Joel  were the singles from 1983 to reach their peak in 1984. Sixty-seven artists scored multiple entries in the top 10 in 1984. Cyndi Lauper, Frankie Goes to Hollywood, Madonna, Prince and The Smiths were among the many artists who achieved their first UK charting top 10 single in 1984.

The 1983 Christmas number-one, an a capella cover of Yazoo's "Only You" by The Flying Pickets, remained at number-one for the first week of 1984. The first new number-one single of the year was "Pipes of Peace" by Paul McCartney. Overall, fifteen different singles peaked at number-one in 1984, with George Michael (4) having the most singles hit that position.

Background

Multiple entries
One-hundred and forty-two singles charted in the top 10 in 1984, with one-hundred and thirty-five singles reaching their peak this year.

Sixty-seven artists scored multiple entries in the top 10 in 1984. George Michael secured the record for most top 10 hits in 1984 with five hit singles.

Chaka Khan was one of a number of artists with two top-ten entries, including the number-one single "I Feel for You". Alison Moyet, Cyndi Lauper, Eurythmics, Michael Jackson and Slade were among the other artists who had multiple top 10 entries in 1984.

Chart debuts
Forty-three artists achieved their first top 10 single in 1984, either as a lead or featured artist. This includes the charity group Band Aid (made up of chart acts but charting together for the first time). Of these, eight went on to record another hit single that year: Alison Moyet, Break Machine, Bronski Beat, Chaka Khan, Cyndi Lauper, Hazell Dean, Madonna and Prince. Frankie Goes to Hollywood and Nik Kershaw both had two other entries in their breakthrough year.

The following table (collapsed on desktop site) does not include acts who had previously charted as part of a group and secured their first top 10 solo single. 

Notes
Snowy White joined Thin Lizzy as a permanent member between 1980 and 1982, with whom he reached the top 10 with the single "Killer on the Loose". His only top 10 single as a solo artist was "Bird of Paradise" which peaked at number 6 in January 1984. Phil Fearon had previously been credited as Galaxy featuring Phil Fearon but for 1984's "What Do I Do" and "Everybody's Laughing" he was credited as Phil Fearon and Galaxy. Similarly, "The Special AKA" were alternatively known as The Specials and had several top 10 singles under this name before "Nelson Mandela" reached number 9 in April 1984.

Grandmaster Flash and the Furious Five frontman Melle Mel took "White Lines (Don't Do It)" to number 7 in July 1984. The group had reached number 8 with "The Message" in 1982. George Michael debuted with "Careless Whisper" in August 1984, the first credited hit single separate from Wham!. The song spent three weeks at number-one. Queen's Freddie Mercury first top 10 single as a solo artist, "Love Kills", got to a high of number 10.

Philip Oakey was the lead singer in The Human League, who had debuted in 1981 with three top 10 singles including "Don't You Want Me". His collaboration with Giorgio Moroder marked the first single to reach the top 10 in his own right. Limahl had been part of Kajagoogoo until his sacking in 1983, his biggest song with the band "Too Shy" reaching the top of the charts. His first solo track was the theme to the film The NeverEnding Story. Ray Parker Jr. had his first and only top 10 single this year, but he did appear on the American single release for a song he wrote, "You See the Trouble with Me" with Barry White in 1976.

Charity collective Band Aid was made up of many artists who had charted previously in their own right, including David Bowie, George Michael, Marilyn, Midge Ure, Paul McCartney,
Paul Young and Phil Collins. Other singers had formerly only performed as part of a group and "Do They Know It's Christmas?" was their first credit outside their band. This included Robert "Kool" Bell, James "J.T." Taylor, Dennis Thomas (all Kool and the Gang), Bono, Adam Clayton (both U2), Chris Cross (Ultravox), Bob Geldof, Johnny Fingers, Simon Crowe (all The Boomtown Rats), Sarah Dallin, Siobhan Fahey, Keren Woodward (all Bananarama), Boy George, Jon Moss (both Culture Club), Glenn Gregory, Martyn Ware (both Heaven 17), Tony Hadley, Gary Kemp, John Keeble, Martin Kemp, Steve Norman (all Spandau Ballet), Simon Le Bon, Andy Taylor, Roger Taylor, Nick Rhodes, John Taylor (all Duran Duran), Rick Parfitt, Francis Rossi (both Status Quo), Sting (The Police), Paul Weller (The Style Council), Stuart Adamson, Mark Brzezicki, Tony Butler and Bruce Watson (all Big Country) and Holly Johnson (Frankie Goes to Hollywood).

Songs from films
Original songs from various films entered the top 10 throughout the year. These included "Against All Odds (Take a Look at Me Now)" (Against All Odds), "Footloose" & "Let's Hear It for the Boy" (Footloose), "Purple Rain" & "When Doves Cry" (Purple Rain), "I Just Called To Say I Love You" (The Woman In Red), "Ghostbusters" (Ghostbusters), "Love Kills" (Giorgio Moroder Presents Metropolis), "Together in Electric Dreams" (Electric Dreams), "The NeverEnding Story" (The NeverEnding Story), "Sexcrime (Nineteen Eighty-Four)" (Nineteen Eighty-Four) and "We All Stand Together" (Rupert and the Frog Song).

Charity singles
A group of musicians came together under the banner of Band Aid and released the single "Do They Know It's Christmas?" in aid of the famine in Ethiopia. The song featured artists including Bob Geldof, Paul Young, Boy George and Paul Weller. It was the Christmas number-one single for 1984, topping the chart for five weeks from 15 December 1984 (week ending).

Best-selling singles
Band Aid had the best-selling single of the year with "Do They Know It's Christmas?". The single spent seven weeks in the top 10 (including five weeks at number one), sold over 2.98 million copies and was certified platinum by the BPI. "I Just Called to Say I Love You" by Stevie Wonder came in second place, selling more than 1.7 million copies and losing out by around 1.28 million sales. Frankie Goes to Hollywood's "Relax", "Two Tribes" from the same act, and "Careless Whisper" by George Michael made up the top five. Songs by Wham! ("Last Christmas"/"Everything She Wants"), Lionel Richie, Black Lace, Ray Parker Jr. and Wham! ("Freedom") were also in the top ten best-selling singles of the year.

Top-ten singles

Entries by artist

The following table shows artists who achieved two or more top 10 entries in 1984, including singles that reached their peak in 1983 or 1985. The figures include both main artists and featured artists, while appearances on ensemble charity records are also counted for each artist. The total number of weeks an artist spent in the top ten in 1984 is also shown.

Notes

 "Like a Virgin" reached its peak of number three on 18 January 1985 (week ending)
 "Relax" re-entered the top 10 at number five on 23 June 1984 (week ending) for nine weeks.
 "Love Theme from The Thorn Birds" was the theme song to the 1983 miniseries The Thorn Birds.
 "99 Red Balloons" was based upon the German version "99 Luftballoons" but the lyrics were not a direct translation.
 "The Music of Torvill and Dean (EP)" re-entered the top 10 at number nine on 7 April 1984 (week ending) for one week.
 The protest song "Nelson Mandela" was known as "Free Nelson Mandela" in some releases, while the group were also known as The Specials. 
 The Frog Chorus on "We All Stand Together" consisted of The King's Singers and the choir from St Paul's Cathedral.
 Released as a charity single by Band Aid to aid famine relief in Ethiopia.
 Figure includes an appearance on the "Do They Know It's Christmas?" charity single by Band Aid.
 Artist recorded a spoken message on B-Side to "Do They Know It's Christmas?".
 Figure includes single that peaked in 1983.
 Figure includes single that first charted in 1983 but peaked in 1984.
 Figure includes single that peaked in 1985.
 Figure includes three top 10 hits with the group Wham!.
 Figure includes three top 10 hits with the group Duran Duran.
 Figure includes three top 10 hits with the group Culture Club.
 Figure includes three top 10 hits with the group Queen.
 Figure includes three top 10 hits with the group Frankie Goes to Hollywood.
 Figure includes three top 10 hits with the group The Style Council.
 Figure includes two top 10 hits with the group Status Quo.
 Figure includes two top 10 hits with the group Spandau Ballet.
 Figure includes two top 10 hits with the group Kool & The Gang.
 Figure includes a top 10 hit with the group U2.
 Figure includes a top 10 hit with the group Big Country.
 Figure includes a top 10 hit with the group Ultravox
 Figure includes a top 10 hit with the group Bananarama.
 Figure includes appearance on Rockwell's "Somebody's Watching Me".
 "Ghostbusters" re-entered the top 10 at number 7 on 29 December 1984 (week ending).

See also
1984 in British music
List of number-one singles from the 1980s (UK)

References
General

Specific

External links
1984 singles chart archive at the Official Charts Company (click on relevant week)
The Official Top 50 best-selling songs of 1984 at the Official Charts Company

United Kingdom
Top 10 singles
1984